Staurofila is a novel composed at the end of the 19th century by the Mexican  author Maria Nestora Tellez  (1828-1890), who described it as an allegorical tale. Because Maria Nestora Tellez suffered a childhood illness that left her blind, she dictated the story to her assistants.   It was first published in Spanish in 1889, anonymously, at the request of the same author, and was released again in 1893 with the mention of the creator, after her death. Since then, it has been published in Mexico on several occasions until today.  It has been described as "a novel of adventures with chivalrous features, an extensive fairy tale, and a hagiographic novel immersed in the hispanic, medieval and Renaissance literary tradition.".

The novel is a didactic narrative that the author told her students to allegorically describe the principles of Christianity, as well as the spiritual growth, and even some eschatological themes. It consists of an allegorical story that describes the daily struggle to maintain freedom, love and life, which are considered gifts of God. By its style, it could be considered an analogous and previous work of those with a relatively similar allegorical style, like the Chronicles of Narnia or The Lord of the Rings, but with a clearer and more direct symbolism. It has been influenced by the Song of Songs and the works of St. Francis de Sales, St. John of the Cross and St. Teresa of Ávila.

Plot Summary  

The King of Lights is a very good sovereign, loved by everyone in his kingdom. One day, he chooses one of his subjects, Protaner, to take care of the prison where he keeps imprisoned a large seven heads serpent, the Serpus. In return, he gives Protaner wealth, a house, and a good social and economic position. Protaner lives happily, marries a beautiful woman named Protogina, and together they have Staurofila as daughter, who, due to her beauty, is chosen to be the future wife of the Prince of Lights, Helios Dicaias, when they both grow up. Unfortunately, Protaner and Protogina betray the king's trust and, by a trick of the Serpus, they let it out. While escaping, the Serpus leaves little Staurofila wounded badly and with a horrible mark on his neck. The king is enraged and declares the death penalty for the marriage. However, the prince goes out to defend them and offers to capture the Serpus to redeem the guilty ones. The king accepts but, until the Serpus is to be captured, he expels Protaner's family from the kingdom and sends them to the Desert of Tears. There go Protaner, Protogina, little Staurofila and Filautia, the old babysitter, who, after smelling some poisonous flowers in the desert, gets crazy and forgets the beautiful Kingdom of Lights. Over time, Protaner and Protogina get lost and never return home, so Filautia asks for asylum, for her and for the girl, to Pseudo-Epythropus, a rich local man, interested only in his earnings, who has two daughters, Peirasy and Proscope. Pseudo-Epythropus notices that Staurofila is very beautiful and receives her with the intention of give her in marriage when she grows up, and thus get some economic or social benefits. 

Years later, Staurofila becomes a beautiful young woman. One day, while she  walks alone, she meets a gentleman named Buletes, sent by the Prince of Lights. Buletes reminds Staurofila her origin and her commitment to the Prince of Lights, who still loves her and looks for her. Buletes shows Staurofila a portrait of the prince and asks her if she would still want to meet the prince and eventually marry him. Staurofila accepts. However, at the same time, the Serpus speaks with Pseudo-Epythropus and offers him great riches in exchange for making Staurofila marry Apollyon, the Prince of Black Shadows, who is a protégé of the Serpus. This Prince of Black Shadows does not really love Staurofila, and if he wants to marry her it is only to take her away from the Prince of Lights, his rival. So, if the Prince of Black Shadows achieves his goal, he will discard Staurofila or imprison her for life. From this point of the story, a series of adventures begin, in which Staurofila hesitates between her love for the two princes. This causes the two rivals to confront with their armies on several occasions and places. Through the successive chapters, one can observe the stages by which the love of Staurofila for the Prince of Lights grows and matures, while the love and mercy of the prince remain constant. Staurofila understands more and more that her role in this war is to respond to the love of the Prince of Lights, to trust in his mercy, to discern good from evil, and to be prepared to resist temptations. In the end, the spiritual growth and the increasing maturity of Staurofila allow her to reach the definitive union with the Prince of Lights.

Symbolism of characters, places and some objects

Structure 
Staurofila is divided into a prologue, 33 chapters divided into three parts, and an epilogue.

Reception and criticism 
The work has attracted readers originally within circles of religious education, later to public interested in the mythological and epic genres, and recently to people interested in works of Latin American women of 19th century. Its novelistic formula has been difficult to classify and considered as unconventional and atypical, both by the mythological plot and its theological symbolism, different from the narrative conventions prevailing Mexico during that time, as by the fact of having been developed by a blind woman, within a society with a rigid patriarchal structure. This Is what has recently attracted people interested in works by Latin American female authors.   It is important to note that although there is a tendency to identify the protagonist as the ideal woman from the time the novel was written, Staurofila actually represents the soul in general, from both women and men. In recent years, from the academic and literary point of view, more extensive work has been done regarding analysis, exegesis and hermeneutic reflection of this novel, based on given methodological proposals, such as that of Dr. Gloria Prado-Garduño.

References

External links 
 Pdf file of Staurofila in the Digital Spanish Library in the site of the National Library of Spain.
 Audiolbook of the first part of Staurofila by Carlos Altamirano M., in YouTube.
 Audiolbook of the second part of Staurofila by Carlos Altamirano M., in YouTube.
 Audiolbook of the third part of Staurofila by Carlos Altamirano M., in YouTube.

1889 novels
Adventure novels
1889 fantasy novels
High fantasy novels
Novels about religion
Works by Mexican writers
Mexican novels
Christianity in fiction